William Charles Schultz (July 30, 1926 – September 21, 2006) was the CEO of Fender Musical Instruments Corporation, and is credited as the "man who saved Fender."

Biography
Born at McKeesport, Pennsylvania, Schultz graduated as an engineer from the New Jersey Institute of Technology in 1965 and went to work for Bethlehem Steel, Baltimore. While working at Bendix Aerospace on radar tracking devices for the Apollo program, he got a master's in aerospace engineering. In 1971 he received an MBA from Rutgers University and got a job at CBS.

Schultz worked at Yamaha Corporation when he was asked to become the company president of Fender in 1981 by then-president of CBS Musical Instruments, John C. McLaren. When CBS decided to sell the struggling company in 1985, Schultz and several other employees purchased it. Schultz was among the management team who recommended CBS to start an alternate production of Japanese Fenders in 1982, as the company's sales suffered from the onslaught of copies produced by Japanese manufacturers such as Tokai and Fernandes Guitars.

Schultz (and through him, Fender) became a major donor to Duquesne University, which honored him in 2001 with a Lifetime Achievement Award and a week of concerts. He retired in 2005 and was replaced by Mendello, though he remained on the board of directors. Schultz died in 2006 of cancer.

References

Fender people
1926 births
2006 deaths
Rutgers University alumni
New Jersey Institute of Technology alumni
Bethlehem Steel people
Bendix Corporation people